The Adventure A series is a family of French paramotors that was designed and produced by Adventure SA of Méré, Yonne for powered paragliding. Now out of production, when they were available the aircraft were supplied complete and ready-to-fly.

Design and development
The A series was designed to comply with the US FAR 103 Ultralight Vehicles rules and is German DULV 1A certified. It features a paraglider-style wing, single-place accommodation and a single  Solo engine in pusher configuration with a 2.5:1 ratio reduction drive, driving a  diameter wooden, fixed pitch propeller. As is the case with all paramotors, take-off and landing is accomplished by foot.

The aircraft is built from aluminium tubing, with a nylon seat and harness. Inflight steering is accomplished via handles that actuate the canopy brakes, creating roll and yaw.

Variants
A3
Initial version, powered by a single  Solo engine
A4
Follow-on version, also powered by a single  Solo engine

Specifications (A3)

References

A series
2000s French ultralight aircraft
Single-engined pusher aircraft
Paramotors